John Lotz (July 17, 1935 – May 5, 2001) was an American college basketball player and coach.  Lotz was best known as the head coach of the Florida Gators men's basketball team, and as a long-time assistant under coach Dean Smith of the North Carolina Tar Heels men's basketball team.

Playing career 

Lotz attended Baylor University in Waco, Texas, where he played for the Baylor Bears basketball team.  He later transferred to East Texas State College (now known as Texas A&M University–Commerce) in Commerce, Texas, where he earned his bachelor's and master's degrees.

Coaching career 

He began his coaching career at high schools in Norwich and Massapequa, New York before moving up to the college level.

Lotz served as an assistant coach for the North Carolina Tar Heels men's basketball team of the University of North Carolina in Chapel Hill, North Carolina under head coach Dean Smith from 1965 to 1973.  During his eight seasons with Smith's Tar Heels, the team made four appearances in the Final Four of the NCAA Tournament.

Lotz was the head coach of the men's basketball team at the University of Florida in Gainesville from 1973 to 1980.  Lotz's 1976–1977 Gators finished 17–9 overall, and 10–8 and in fourth place in the Southeastern Conference (SEC). That was his only winning record in conference play. Following a 4–7 start to the 1979–80 season (including 1–3 in conference play), Lotz was fired. He finished his seven-year tenure as the Florida Gators' head coach with an overall record of 83–88 and 46–66 in the SEC.

Life after basketball 

After his coaching career ended in 1980, Lotz returned to the University of North Carolina as an assistant athletic director and he directed the community outreach program. He involved hundreds of North Carolina student-athletes in various volunteer projects, including the Thanksgiving food drive for underprivileged families, the Juvenile Diabetes Walkathon, and clothing collections for the needy. Lotz received the Governor's Award for Excellence for Crime Prevention in recognition of his work with youth in Chapel Hill and Carrboro.

Lotz died in Chapel Hill on May 5, 2001, after a brief fight with a malignant brain tumor; he was 64 years old.  He was survived by his wife Vicki and their two daughters.  The Fellowship of Christian Athletes (FCA) inducted Lotz into its "Hall of Champions" in 2001.  In 2003, the FCA established its annual John Lotz Barnabas Award to "honor a basketball coach who best exhibits a commitment to Christ, integrity, encouragement to others and lives a balanced life"; past winners include John Wooden and Steve Alford.  The Chapel Hill Police Department named its summer basketball camp in Lotz's honor.

Head coaching record

Men's basketball

See also 

 Florida Gators
 List of Texas A&M–Commerce alumni
 North Carolina Tar Heels

References

Bibliography 

 Koss, Bill, Pond Birds: Gator Basketball, The Whole Story From The Inside, Fast Break Press, Gainesville, Florida (1996).  .

1935 births
2001 deaths
American men's basketball coaches
American men's basketball players
Basketball coaches from New York (state)
Baylor Bears men's basketball players
College men's basketball head coaches in the United States
Florida Gators men's basketball coaches
North Carolina Tar Heels men's basketball coaches
People from Flushing, Queens
People from Massapequa, New York
People from Norwich, New York
Texas A&M–Commerce Lions men's basketball players